Vinodini Sasimohan is the Chief Administrative Officer of Viswa Kala Kendra, Thiruvananthapuram, India. She was a child artist in Malayalam cinema. Her role as Goddess Devi Kanya Kumari in the film Devi Kanyakumari was noteworthy. 

She is the last child of Guru Gopinath, the famous Indian classical dancer. She is married to T. SasiMohan, a senior journalist and presently the Editor, Communications Department, Santhigiri Ashram. Viswa Kala Kendra is an art institution founded by Guru Gopinath to impart training in Kerala Natanam, Kathakali and Ottamthullal.

Vinodini, then popular as Baby Vinodini, acted in 17 Malayalam films in the 1960s with leading actors like Sathyan, Prem Nazir, Thikkurissy, Ambika, Miss Kumari, Ragini, Jose Prakash, Aranmula Ponnamma, K. R. Vijaya and others.

Selected filmography
Kannum Kalarum (double role)
Ammaye Kaanaan (1963) as Suhasini
Chilampoli
Bhaktha Kuchela(1961) as Young Krishna
Guruvayoorappan as Guruvayoorappan/Unnikrishnan
Bharthav
Snehadeepam as Usha
Puthiya Akaasam Puthiya Bhoomi
Kadalamma as little princess
Omanakkuttan
Karuthakai
Kaliyodam
Kadaththukaran (1965) as Leela
Manavatti as Joy mon- Boy's role
Devi Kanyakumari (lead role as Devi)
Swami Ayyappan

In Kannum Kalarum she acted in dual role with Kamal Haasan, who went on to become a leading actor in Indian cinema.

References

External links

 http://www.thirtysixmm.com/36mm/celebrity/vinodini-sasimohan/

Living people
Actresses in Malayalam cinema
Indian film actresses
Actresses from Thiruvananthapuram
20th-century Indian actresses
Child actresses in Malayalam cinema
Year of birth missing (living people)